West Branch Mohawk River is a river in Oneida County, New York. It begins at the confluence of Egger Brook and Lyman Brook, flows through the hamlet of West Branch, and empties into Mohawk River east of the hamlet.

References

Rivers of New York (state)
Rivers of Oneida County, New York